ACMC may refer to:

 Arts Council of Mendocino County
 Assistant Commandant of the Marine Corps

 Amazing Cinematic Music Channel